Thrine Kane (born May 24, 1981, in Rockville Centre, New York) is an American sport shooter. She placed 35th in the women's 50 metre rifle three positions event at the 2000 Summer Olympics.

References

1981 births
Living people
ISSF rifle shooters
American female sport shooters
Olympic shooters of the United States
Shooters at the 2000 Summer Olympics
21st-century American women